Rafaél Manuel Almansa Riaño (2 August 1840 - 28 June 1927) was a Colombian Catholic priest and a professed member of the Franciscan Order. Riaño dedicated his pastoral career to the care of the poor and to the administering of the sacraments in the parishes and communities that he served in. He faced initial persecution due to anti-Christian sentiment but gained a formidable reputation as a saint once he managed to resume his duties as a priest.

He was declared to be Venerable in 2016 once Pope Francis signed a decree that certified his life of heroic virtue. A singular miracle for his beatification is now under investigation.

Life
Riaño was born in Bogotá on 2 August 1840 to Ambrosio Riaño and María del Rosario. He was baptized in the church of Las Nieves on 3 August.

He commenced his studies for the priesthood in 1853 at the convent of Saint Francis but was forced to suspend his studies in 1861 after President Tomás Cipriano de Mosquera expropriated the lands of the church in the nation. Once that all passed he was at last ordained as a priest on 27 May 1866 which he received from the Bishop of Pamplona Bonifacio Antonio Tozcano.

Riaño was appointed as the parish priest for Cúcuta and was transferred as the coadjutor to Bucaramanga following the 1875 earthquake. In 1881 he joined the Order of Friars Minor and was appointed as its chaplain in the church of Saint Francis at Bogotá. In 1895 he travelled to Rome for the General Chapter of the order and met with Pope Leo XIII. On 18 December 1897 the Archbishop of Bogotá, Bernardo Herrera Restrepo, made him the chaplain of the church of San Diego and he remained in that position until his death. Riaño aided the poor of his parishes and made the effort to spread the love of Jesus Christ to all his flock; he was known for his peacemaking and mediation in times of turmoil while known for his simple and austere methods of living. He also had a liking for the sacrament of Reconciliation despite his love for administering all sacraments. He was said to have slept on a bed made of stones with no pillow or blanket.

He died on 28 June 1927; around 100 000 were reported to have attended his visitation and funeral.

Beatification process
The beatification process commenced under Pope John Paul II in Bogotá once the Congregation for the Causes of Saints granted the "nihil obstat" (nothing against) to the cause on 27 October 1995 in a simultaneous act that conferred upon him the title of Servant of God. The diocesan process opened on 24 November 1995 and concluded its business in collecting documents and interrogatories on 24 February 1997 - there were also 20 cases of purported miracles recorded for the cause though one was selected for investigation. Roman officials validated the process on 24 September 1999.

The Congregation for the Causes of Saints received the Positio dossier in Rome in 2010 and historians deemed that the cause bore no historical obstacles on 1 March 2011. Riaño was proclaimed to be Venerable on 9 May 2016 after Pope Francis acknowledged the late priest's life of heroic virtue.

The investigation for an alleged miracle occurred in the 1990s in Bogotá and was validated in Rome on 28 September 1998.

The current postulator assigned to the cause is the Franciscan Giovangiuseppe Califano.

References

External links
Hagiography Circle
Saints SQPN

1840 births
1927 deaths
19th-century venerated Christians
19th-century Colombian people
20th-century venerated Christians
19th-century Colombian Roman Catholic priests
20th-century Colombian Roman Catholic priests
Friars Minor
People from Bogotá
Venerated Catholics by Pope Francis